The Glenmore Sailing Club (GSC) is a sailing club in Calgary.

References

External links
Glenmore Sailing Club

Yacht clubs in Canada
Sport in Calgary
Organizations based in Calgary